The Italy national baseball team represents Italy in international baseball competitions. The Italian national team was ranked 16th in the world as of 2022. The team is managed by Mike Piazza, a former New York Mets player and  Major League Baseball Hall of Fame inductee.

Results and fixtures
The following is a list of professional baseball match results currently active in the latest version of the WBSC World Rankings, as well as any future matches that have been scheduled.

Legend

2019

2021

2022

2023

Tournament record

World Baseball Classic

Of the 30 players on Italy's roster, at least 23 were born in the US. A player is eligible to participate on a World Baseball Classic team if:
The player is a citizen of the nation the team represents.
The player is qualified for citizenship or to hold a passport under the laws of a nation represented by a team, but has not been granted citizenship or been issued a passport, then the player may be made eligible by WBCI upon petition by the player or team.
The player is a permanent legal resident of the nation or territory the team represents.
The player was born in the nation or territory the team represents.
The player has one parent who is, or if deceased was, a citizen of the nation the team represents.
The player has one parent who was born in the nation or territory the team represents.

2006
Italy competed in Pool D, which included Venezuela, the Dominican Republic and Australia. All games during round one for Pool D were played at The Ballpark at Disney's Wide World of Sports in Lake Buena Vista, Florida.

Italy secured an impressive 10–0 win over Australia in its first game, invoking the mercy rule after seven innings. However, they dropped their next two games to Venezuela, 6–0, and the Dominican Republic, 8–3, and failed to qualify for the second round of the tournament.

2009
With only ten players on their roster with any major league affiliation, Italy was a heavy underdog in Pool C of the 2009 World Baseball Classic. With Canada, the U.S.A. & Venezuela completing Pool C, it was arguably the toughest pool in the WBC.

Prior to the start of the WBC, Italy played two spring training games against the Washington Nationals and New York Mets. Italy trailed through most of the game against the Nationals until Chris Denorfia and Michael Costanzo drove in a run apiece in the seventh inning, and an eighth-inning two-run home run by Valentino Pascucci tied the game at six. A ninth-inning walk-off three-run home run by Roger Bernadina capped off a late rally in the Nats' 9–6 victory over Italy.

Against the Mets, Italy led 2–0 going into the ninth inning. Cory Sullivan hit a two-run home run to tie the game at two, and Jeremy Reed doubled in Daniel Murphy to give the Mets a 3–2 victory.

Italy was again shut out by Venezuela in their first  WBC game, 7–0 on March 7. Starter Mark DiFelice held Venezuela scoreless through the first four innings; however, Venezuela immediately took advantage of Italy's less experienced bullpen, exploding for 4 runs in the fifth.

Against Canada on March 9, Italy pulled off one of the more surprising upsets in the 2009 WBC, winning 6–2, and eliminating the heavily favored Canadian team. Italy led 3–0 heading into the fourth inning, until Canada jumped on starter Dan Serafini for two runs. With the bases loaded and only one out, reliever Chris Cooper struck out Peter Orr, then got Chris Barnwell to fly out to center to end the threat, and keep Italy in the lead. In all, Italy's bullpen pitched six innings without giving up a run.

With this victory, Italy faced their nemeses, Venezuela, a second time. After three scoreless innings pitched by Italian starter Adam Ottavino, Venezuela again dominated Italy's bullpen, scoring four runs in the fourth, and five in the fifth to win 10–1, and eliminate Italy from the World Baseball Classic.

2013
Again considered a heavy underdog, Italy won its first two games in Pool D, 6–5 with a 9th-inning comeback over Mexico and 14–4 over Canada in a game called in the 8th inning due to the mercy rule. They lost both games in Round 2 against the Dominican Republic and Puerto Rico, thus eliminating them from the tournament.

2017

After a win 10–9 against Mexico, and defeats 11–10 against Venezuela, and 9–3 against Puerto Rico, Italy clinched qualification for the next WBC in 2021.

Olympic Games

Italy failed to qualify for the 2008 Summer Olympics in Beijing for the first time since baseball became an official Olympic sport in 1992. Italy's best finish in an Olympics is sixth place, which they did in both 1996 and 2000. There was no official placing as Baseball at the 1984 Summer Olympics was a demonstration sport.

At the International Olympic Committee (IOC) meeting on July 8, baseball and softball were voted out of the 2012 Summer Olympics in London, becoming the first sports voted out of the Olympics since polo was eliminated from the 1936 Summer Olympics.

Because Team Italy finished in the top five in the 2019 European Baseball Championship it moved on to the 2020 Olympics qualifiers, in Italy September 18–22.

IBAF Amateur World Series, Baseball World Cup, and WBSC Premier12

In , the event became known as the International Baseball Federation's (IBAF) World Cup. The 2009 IBAF World Cup was hosted by Europe. It was the first time in history the World Cup was hosted by a whole continent rather than an individual country.

2007 IBAF World Cup
On November 9, Italy handed the U.S.A. team their only loss in Team U.S.A.'s route to win the 2007 Baseball World Cup in Taiwan. It was the U.S.'s first loss to Italy in 21 years and the first time it ever lost to Italy with professional players, as the team consisted of Major League Baseball players and top minor league prospects.

Both Italy and Panama ended up with 3–4 records in the 2007 games; however, Panama's 5.85 run ratio versus Italy's 4.73 placed them in fifth place while Italy settled for sixth.

2009

The 2009 Baseball World Cup took place from September 9–27. Seven European countries hosted and participant in the tournament of 22 teams. The event was made up of five groups consisting of four teams each, for a total of 20 teams. Italy (Bollate, Bologna, Codogno, Florence, Godo, Macerata, Parma, Piacenza, Reggio Emilia, Rimini, San Marino, Torino, Trieste, Verona, and Vicenza) and Netherlands (Rotterdam, Haarlem and Amsterdam) serve as hosts of the 16 teams of the second round (September 14–20), and therefore received first round byes. The groups were as follows:

Group A (hosted by the Czech Republic in Prague): Czech Republic, Australia, Chinese Taipei and Mexico
Group B (hosted by Spain in Barcelona): Spain, Cuba, Puerto Rico and South Africa
Group C (hosted by Sweden in Stockholm): Sweden, Canada, Korea and Netherlands Antilles
Group D (hosted by Russia in Moscow): Russia, France/Great Britain, Japan and Nicaragua
Group E (hosted by Germany in Regensburg): Germany, China, U.S.A. and Venezuela

The group Italy hosted in the second round included Australia, Canada, Taiwan, Japan, Mexico, Netherlands Antilles and the U.S.A.. Italy's first three match-ups against Chinese Taipei, Mexico, and Australia all resulted in losses. Their first victory came against Japan on September 18. Italy lost two more to Canada and the U.S.A. before winning their final game against Netherlands Antilles. Italy finished the second round with a 2–5 record, and were eliminated.

Italy hosted the final round from September 22–27 in Grosseto, Nettuno, Anzio, Matino, Caserta, Messina, Palermo and Rome, consisting of eight teams. Team USA won the gold medal game of the 2009 IBAF World Cup in Nettuno 10–5 over Cuba.

Intercontinental Cup

The Intercontinental Cup is another international baseball competition sponsored by the IBAF. Italy's best finish ever was third place, which they did in the  games.

2006
In the tournament held in Taichung, Taiwan November 9–19, Italy finished sixth. They secured an impressive 13–3 victory over Chinese Taipei in their first game of the tournament, however, they lost their next three match-ups to Netherlands, Cuba, and Australia (13 innings). After coming back with a victory against the Philippines, Italy lost their next two to Japan and South Korea to end the round robin first phase of the tournament with a 2–5 record.

Italy came back to beat South Korea in the first game of the following round, 8–3. In the battle for fifth place, Italy lost to Australia, 3–2.

2010

Italy beat Chinese Taipei 4–3 in the bronze medal game, gaining the first medal in its International Cup history.

European Baseball Championship

The European Baseball Championship is the main championship tournament between national baseball teams in Europe, governed by the WBSC Europe. It is currently held every other year in odd-numbered years with a total of 30 European Baseball Championships having been played.

Italy has won nine gold medals in the European Baseball Championship, with their most recent being in 2012. In total, Italy has won 27 medals (16 silver, 3 bronze). The only country to have fared better is the Netherlands (21 gold, 7 silver).

2009 European Baseball Championship
Italy qualified for the 2009 European Baseball Championship from the 2007 competition. The other qualifiers were Netherlands, Great Britain, Spain, Germany, France, and Sweden.

Qualification for the 2009 European Baseball Championship was held from July 7 to July 12, with 23 nations vying for the remaining five spots. Belgium, Croatia, the Czech Republic, Greece and Ukraine were the winners.

However, the tournament was delayed to 2010. Italy won it 13 years after their last victory.

2019 European Baseball Championship
Team Italy competed in the 2019 European Baseball Championship, coming in second and winning the silver medal. Among the players competing for it were John Andreoli, Chris Colabello, Filippo Crepaldi, Murilo Gouvea, Luis Lugo, Alessandro Maestri, Drew Maggi, Giuseppe Mazzanti, Sebastiano Poma, and Alessandro Vaglio.

See also
 Italy women's national softball team

References

External links
FIBS web site

National baseball teams in Europe
Baseball